Loadestone is the tenth studio album by Spear Of Destiny. The album was the first release on Brandon's own record label Eastersnow. The album features a cover of "Transmission" originally  by Joy Division, one of Brandon's favourite bands.

Track listing
All tracks composed by Kirk Brandon; except where indicated
"Age of Unreason" - 4:42
"In Transit" - 5:37
"Philadelphia" - 3:52
"Transmission" (Bernard Sumner, Ian Curtis, Peter Hook, Stephen Morris) - 5:00
"Pskotik" - 5:37
"The Devils Game" - 4:39
"Cogs" - 5:42
"Resurrection" - 2:32
"Last Man Standing" - 4:52
"Parade for the Living" - 5:41
"Red Dust Rocketeers" - 3:27
"Palestine" - 3:05
"Requiem for the Presidents" - 5:41
"Invaders" - 0:29

Personnel
Spear of Destiny
Kirk Brandon - vocals, guitar
Steve Allan Jones - keyboards 
James Yardley - bass 
Warren Wilson - guitar 
Chris Bell - drums, percussion
Derek Forbes - bass

2005 albums
Spear of Destiny (band) albums